In mathematical logic, an elementary theory is a theory that involves axioms using only finitary first-order logic, without reference to set theory or using any axioms which have consistency strength equal to set theory.

Saying that a theory is elementary is a weaker condition than saying it is algebraic.

Examples

Examples of elementary theories include:
 The theory of groups
 The theory of finite groups
 The theory of abelian groups
 The theory of fields
 The theory of finite fields
 The theory of real closed fields
 Axiomization of Euclidean geometry

Related
Elementary sentence
Elementary definition
Elementary theory of the reals

References

 Mac Lane and Moerdijk, Sheaves in Geometry and Logic: A First Introduction to Topos Theory, page 4.

Mathematical logic